Frances Winwar (née Francesca Vinciguerra; 3 May 1900 – 24 July 1985), was a Sicilian-born American biographer, translator, and fiction writer.

Early life 
Winwar was born Francesca Vinciguerra in Taormina, Sicily and came to the United States through Ellis Island in June 1907. Her pseudonym Winwar is an calque of her birth name; she was required to change her name as a condition of publishing her first book. She was the daughter of Domenico Vinciguerra and the singer Giovanna Sciglio and after emigrating to the United States the family settled in New York. Winwar studied at Hunter College and Columbia University.

Career 
Winwar started her career at The Masses magazine at the age of 18. Following the publication of an essay in The Freeman in 1923 she worked for the magazine and did further work for the New York Times, New Republic and the Saturday Review of Literature.

Winwar is best known for her series of romanticized biographies of nineteenth century English writers. She was also a frequent translator of classic Italian works into English and published several romantic novels set during historical events.

In the 1930s and 1940s, Winwar was an outspoken opponent of Italian Fascism.

Winwar died in New York in 1985.

The Frances Winwar collection of manuscripts and correspondence is held at the Howard Gotlieb Archival Research Center at Boston University.

Selected published works

Family 
Her husbands were:
<ol type="1" start="1">
 V.J. Jerome (né Jerome Isaac Romaine; 1896–1965), writer, communist propagandist (married 1919);
 Bernard David N. Brebanier (1903–1977), educator (married 1925; divorced 1942);
 Richard Wilson Webb (1901–1966), mystery novelist (married 1943);
 Francis duPont Lazenby, Ph.D. (1916–2003) (married 1949; divorced 1953); after divorcing; Lazenby, in 1955, joined the faculty at the University of Notre Dame; in 1971, after 25 years at Notre Dame, while Associate Professor of Modern and Classical Languages, Notre Dame named him Professor Emeritus.</ol>

References

Further reading
 
Peragallo, Olga (1949) Italian-American Authors'' (New York)

1900 births
1985 deaths
20th-century American novelists
American women novelists
Italian–English translators
Italian emigrants to the United States
20th-century American women writers
20th-century American translators
20th-century American biographers
American women biographers
American anti-fascists